The 2022–23 season is Livingston's fifth consecutive season in the Scottish Premiership, the top flight of Scottish football. Livingston will also compete in the League Cup and the Scottish Cup.

Season Summary

Results & fixtures

Pre-season

Scottish Premiership

Scottish League Cup

Group stage

Knockout round

Scottish Cup

Squad statistics

Appearances
As of 18 March 2023

|-
|colspan="10"|Players who left the club during the season
|-

|}

Team statistics

League table

League Cup table

Transfers

Players in

Players out

Loans in

Loans out

See also
List of Livingston F.C. seasons

References

Livingston F.C. seasons
Livingston